The White Rim Sandstone is a sandstone geologic formation located in southeastern Utah. It is the last member of the Permian Cutler Group, and overlies the major Organ Rock Formation and Cedar Mesa Sandstone; and again overlies thinner units of the Elephant Canyon and Halgaito Formations.

The White Rim is eponymous, as the sandstone is named for its prominent white color, and forms the rims of cliffs.

Geology
It is the continental geologic formation deposited at the time of marine transgressions during the Early to Middle Permian Period.

Toroweap Formation
The coeval Toroweap Formation was laid down under marine conditions along the southwest margin of the North American continent and is found in northwest Arizona layered between Coconino Sandstone and the Kaibab Formation. The Toroweap is mostly from the Grand Canyon and just eastwards to Lee's Ferry-(Colorado River, Grand Canyon), south to the Verde Valley region (Sedona, Sycamore Canyon, Oak Creek Canyon), but the Toroweap also occurs within sections in southeast Utah, and also became overlain by the Kaibab Formation, specifically at the Circle Cliffs, west of the Waterpocket Fold.

Geography
The White Rim Sandstone typically occurs above the Organ Rock Formation in southeast Utah, which sits upon the extensive Cedar Mesa Sandstone in southeast Utah.

Occurrences in Utah
The Circle Cliffs are located in the northeast of Grand Staircase–Escalante National Monument. The cliffs also extend north-northwest adjacent the west perimeter of the Waterpocket Fold, Capitol Reef National Park. The fold is traversed by Burr Trail Road-Straton Road which has views toward the Circle Cliffs, southward, or westward.

The White Rim Road traverses the White Rim Sandstone formation between the base of the Island in the Sky mesa and the Colorado and Green Rivers within Canyonlands National Park.

Circle Cliffs, (extreme south)-southeast-Utah
Moenkopi Formation
Toroweap Formation-White Rim Sandstone
Organ Rock Formation
Cedar Mesa Sandstone
Moab, Utah — W. Colorado
Moenkopi Formation
White Rim Sandstone
Organ Rock Formation
Cedar Mesa Sandstone

See also
Geology of the Canyonlands area
Geology of the Zion and Kolob canyons area

Gallery

White Rim & Organ Rock

References

Further reading
Blakey, and Ranney, 2008. Ancient Landscapes of the Colorado Plateau, Ron Blakey, Wayne Ranney, c 2008, Grand Canyon Association (publisher), 176 pages, with Appendix, Glossary, Index. Contains approximately 75 shaded topographic maps, for geology, etc., with 54 (23 pairs, (46)) for Colorado Plateau specifically; others are global, or North American.
 Utah DeLorme Atlas & Gazetteer, 7th Edition, c. 2010, 64 pages, pp. 24, 32.

Sandstone formations of the United States
Geologic formations of Utah
Colorado Plateau
Permian geology of Utah
Cisuralian Series of North America
Cutler Formation